Swissmem is the association for Switzerland's mechanical and electrical engineering industries (MEM industries) and related technology-oriented sectors. It represents the interests of the MEM industries in the commercial, political and public spheres, and boosts the competitive capacity of its 1,250 or so member companies with needs-based services. These include training and development courses for employees in the sector, consulting services, networks and a compensation fund.

Martin Hirzel has been President of Swissmem since 2021. Stefan Brupbacher has been its CEO since 2019.

Swissmem is headquartered in Zurich.

History 
The history of Swissmem began in 1883 with the founding of the Swiss Association of Machinery Manufacturers (VSM). The Association’s goal was: “To safeguard and promote the general interests of the Swiss engineering industry”. Consequently, the engineering industry employers established the Association of Swiss Engineering Employers (ASM) from the ranks of the VSM in 1905. The ASM’s purpose was to safeguard its members’ interests in the area of social policy. Both associations have been operating under the Swissmem name since 1999.

In September 2006, the ASM and VSM members voted in favour of continuing integration. In early 2007, the VSM became Swissmem and took on all of the ASM’s activities except those relating to the sector’s collective employment agreement (GAV). The ASM continues to exist legally as an independent organization and is a contractual partner in the collective employment agreement for the Swiss MEM industries. The MEM industries’ GAV traditionally blazes a trail for many other Swiss GAVs and has evolved from the “industrial peace agreement” of 1937 to the high-level agreement of today.

Members 
More than 1,250 companies are members of Swissmem. They include ABB, Bucher, Bühler, Geberit, Georg Fischer, Pilatus, Rieter, Schindler, Siemens, Stadler and many more. 85% of all Swissmem members are small and medium-sized enterprises (SMEs).

With around 320,000 employees, including more than 15,000 apprentices, the MEM industries are among the biggest employers in Switzerland. They generate total annual sales of CHF 79.9 billion (2020). This equates to around 7% (2020) of GDP. The MEM industries thus occupy a key position within the Swiss economy. The sector accounts for almost a third of Switzerland’s total goods exports, with a value of CHF 60.7 billion (2020).

Services

Representation of interests 
Swissmem is the voice of the Swiss MEM industries in the commercial, political and public spheres, and campaigns for the sector on relevant matters. The association advocates for good economic policy framework conditions and a liberal labour market, and is committed to a constructive social partnership.

Training 
From basic education, to inspirational seminars, to management training, Swissmem offers practice-oriented training opportunities at a wide variety of levels. Swissmem’s vocational training school is the centre of excellence for basic professional training for careers as a plant engineer, automation technician, automation fitter, design engineer, electronics technician, multi-skilled mechanic, production mechanic and mechanical practitioner. The centre of excellence supports businesses with a wide range of training offerings for apprentices and professionals. With the Swissmem Academy, the association maintains its own training centre. Its offering includes courses, seminars and in-house training sessions. In general, it is open to all. Special conditions are available for employees of Swissmem member companies.

Advice 
Swissmem members can also access services such as professional advice on employment, commercial, contract and environmental law, energy efficiency, and knowledge and technology transfer.

Networking 
Swissmem members are part of a broad industry network. The individual sub-sectors within the MEM industries join together in a total of 28 industry sectors. Each industry sector organizes itself and enjoys a great deal of autonomy within Swissmem. One focus area for the industry sectors is that of sharing experiences and networking. They also collect market-relevant performance indicators and data. Marketing activities are important too, and many industry sectors are also members of European or global umbrella organizations.

Industry sectors:

 Power engineering transmission
 Assembly and factory automation
 Additive manufacturing
 Automotive
 Dimensional measurement
 Fluid technology
 Printing machinery
 Intralogistics, packaging and handling technology
 Compressors, pneumatic and vacuum technology
 Plastics machinery
 New energy systems
 Photonics
 Precision tools
 Pump technology
 Space
 Welding technology
 Swiss Additive Manufacturing Group
 Swiss Airport Suppliers
 SWISS ASD
 Textile machinery
 Transmission and distribution
 Environmental technology
 Internal combustion engines
 Process engineering equipment
 Die and mould industry
 Machine tools
 ZMIS/SSMI

Every year, Swissmem organizes the Swissmem Industry Day. Over 1,000 decision-makers from industry, business and politics meet to discuss topical issues and make use of networking opportunities.

Social partnership 
In 1937, the ASM and the trade unions concluded the first collective employment agreement, or GAV, for the Swiss MEM industries. Since then, this agreement has formed the core element of the social partnership and is renegotiated once every five years. The current GAV has been in force since 2018. The contractual partners on the employees’ side are Employees Switzerland, Kaufmännischer Verband Schweiz, SKO, SYNA and Unia.

References

External links 
 Official website

Business organisations based in Switzerland
Electrical engineering organizations
Mechanical engineering organizations
Science and technology in Switzerland